Ernst Volgenau is a retired United States Air Force office and founder and former CEO of SRA International.  He later served as chairman of the board for the company, and rector of the George Mason University board of visitors.

Early life and education
Volgenau came from a farm in Clarence, New York to the U.S. Naval Academy.  He wrestled and threw the javelin. He graduated in 1955 and was commissioned a lieutenant in the Air Force.  Later he earned a master's degree in electrical engineering, and in 1966 his Ph.D. in engineering at UCLA. He taught graduate courses in electrical engineering, computer systems, and operations research at UCLA, American University, and George Washington University for eight years.{

Military career
In the United States Air Force 1955–1976, Colonel Volgenau had assignments in aerospace research and development, in the Office of the Secretary of Defense, and as Director of Data Automation for the Air Force Logistics Command.  As Director of Inspection and Enforcement for the U.S. Nuclear Regulatory Commission 1976–1978 he managed 700 engineers.  He subsequently consulted for the Indian Head Company, a firm with a subsidiary supplied pumps to nuclear power plants in the United States.

SRA International
After retirement from the Air Force in 1978, he founded SRA International and operated it initially in his Reston basement.  The company grew to several thousand employees and went public.  He was president and CEO until 2005.  He was chairman of the board in 2013.

Honors
He was rector of the George Mason University board of visitors (2007–2012.) The university's Volgenau School of Information Technology and Engineering bears his name. His $10 million donation to that program was the largest it had ever received.

In August 2020, the Nature Conservancy named its Virginia Coast Reserve in honor of multiple gifts by the Volgenau family over 30 years.

References

Living people
1930s births 
American computer businesspeople
United States Naval Academy alumni
UCLA Henry Samueli School of Engineering and Applied Science alumni
George Mason University people
UCLA Henry Samueli School of Engineering and Applied Science faculty
George Washington University faculty
American University faculty and staff
Engineers from New York (state)
Recipients of the Legion of Merit
United States Air Force officers
People from McLean, Virginia
People from Clarence, New York
Nuclear Regulatory Commission officials